Computers in Biology and Medicine is a monthly peer-reviewed scientific journal established in 1970. It covers the intersection of biomedical engineering, computational biology, bioinformatics, and computer science. The journal publishes research articles, reviews, tutorials, editorials, and letters. According to the Journal Citation Reports, the journal has a 2021 impact factor of 6.698.

References

External links 
 

Publications established in 1970
Elsevier academic journals
Bioinformatics and computational biology journals
Monthly journals
English-language journals